Lēdurga Parish is an administrative unit of Sigulda Municipality in the Vidzeme region of Latvia.

Towns, villages and settlements of Lēdurga Parish

References 

Parishes of Latvia
Sigulda Municipality
Vidzeme